James Gamble, KPM, is a former police officer and head of Belfast region for the now disbanded RUC Special Branch.

Gamble was the head of the Child Exploitation and Online Protection Command (CEOP) Centre in the United Kingdom until 2010, and is now CEO of the INEQE Safeguarding Group.

Career

RUC Special Branch
Gamble's father was in the Royal Air Force. Before joining the Royal Ulster Constabulary as a constable, Gamble served in the Royal Military Police. Early in his career he was head of the controversial Royal Ulster Constabulary anti-terrorist intelligence unit in Belfast, then Deputy Director General (with the rank of deputy chief constable) of the National Crime Squad, which in April 2006, merged into the Serious Organised Crime Agency.  He was also the head of the Belfast Region of the RUC Special Branch.

National Criminal Intelligence Service
Gamble led the National Criminal Intelligence Service (NCIS) fight against child sex abuse. He also presided over Operation Ore. He led the work to set up the National Crime Squad's specialist response cell – the Paedophile and Online Investigation Team (POLIT). He was awarded the Queen's Police Medal (QPM) in the 2008 New Year Honours.

Application to lead PSNI
In 2009, Hugh Orde resigned as Police Service of Northern Ireland chief constable.  Gamble applied for the position but was unsuccessful with the position being filled by Matt Baggott, the former chief constable of Leicestershire who was the successful candidate. Gamble stated that he believed his background as an RUC Special Branch officer may have been a factor in why he was not selected for the role.

Gamble was a co-author on the UK's first Domestic Homicide Review (Pemberton) and in 2010 was appointed by the then Home Secretary to lead the initial scoping review of the investigation into the disappearance of Madeleine McCann.

CEOP
Gamble resigned as CEO of CEOP in October 2010 after the Home Secretary Theresa May's decision to merge CEOP with SOCA and other bodies into a new National Crime Agency. Gamble wanted CEOP to remain independent.

Gamble then created the 'Ineqe Safeguarding Group'. He is a frequent media commentator on issues related to protective services, best practice, the internet and child protection.

Labour Party membership
In 2015, Gamble joined the Labour Party in Northern Ireland. Gamble stated that he wanted Labour candidates to be allowed to stand in Northern Ireland, but that he would have no plans to run himself.

Later that year Gamble voted for Yvette Cooper during the Labour Party leadership election. Cooper was defeated with 17% of the vote and the eventual winner would be Jeremy Corbyn.

He has commissioned a number of Serious Case and Practice Learning Reviews and authored numerous strategic and thematic reports, including the Brighton and Sussex University Hospital Trust and the Independent Safeguarding Review of Oxfam GB.

Gamble has been called to give evidence at the Independent Inquiry into Child Sex Abuse (IICSA) on two occasions. The first related to child abuse on the internet and the second to faith-based institutions.

See also
 Internet Watch Foundation
 Police Service of Northern Ireland
 ThinkUKnow
 Virtual Global Taskforce

References

Living people
People from Bangor, County Down
Police Service of Northern Ireland officers
Northern Irish recipients of the Queen's Police Medal
Royal Ulster Constabulary officers
British police chief officers
Royal Military Police soldiers
1959 births